Church Street is a street in Liverpool, England, lying between Bold Street to the east and Lord Street to the west. It is the main shopping area of Liverpool and takes its name from St Peter's Church, which was demolished in 1922. The side streets to the north of Church Street lead to Williamson Square, while the Grade I listed Bluecoat Chambers—the oldest surviving building in Liverpool—is to the south along Church Alley. The Liverpool Athenaeum, an institution founded in the 18th century, is also on Church Alley. The area behind the shops on the south side of Church Street is now part of the Liverpool One shopping complex, which opened in October 2008 after the redevelopment of a large part of the L1 postcode area (hence the name).

References

External links
 A short film showing Church Street in 1897

Shopping streets in Liverpool